Spine is a 1986 American horror film written and directed by John Howard and Justin Simmonds and starring Janus Blythe.

Plot
A madman stalks nurses, brutally stabbing them to death. In his fevered mind, he believes his victims to be a woman from his past named Linda. Police struggle to apprehend him before he can murder and mutilate again.

Cast
 Kathy Rose as First Victim
 R. Eric Huxley as Lawrence Ashton
 John Howard as Leo Meadows (as Antoine Herzog)
 Bill Eberwein	as Chuck Roast
 Marie Dowling	as Lori Anderson
 Dan Watson as Man in Office
 Abby Sved as Louise Morton
 James Simonds	as Police Captain
 Donna Sayles	as Bobbie Jones
 Carl Elliot as Sam Joffrey
 Larry Nielson	as Charlie Saunders
 Lise Romanoff	as Leah Petralla
 Janus Blythe as Carrie Lonegan
 Brenda Brandon as Computer Technician
 Terry Simonds as At Police Headquarters
 Jason Eberweinas At Police Headquarters
 Roger Watkins as At Police Headquarters (as Ray Hicks)

Release
It was released directly to video somewhere in 1986.

References

External links
 
 
 Spine complete film on YouTube

American horror films
1986 films
1980s American films